Turkey participated as the host nation in the 2013 Mediterranean Games held in Mersin, Turkey from 20 to 30 June 2013.

Medal table

Archery

Men

Women

Athletics 

Men's

Men

Women

Paralympic

Badminton

Men
 Group stage

 Knockout stage

Women
Group stage

Knockout stage

Basketball

Men's tournament

Team 

Coach:  Bogdan Tanjević

Preliminary round

Semifinal

Gold medal match

Final standing

Beach volleyball

Men's tournament

Preliminary round

 Knockout stage

Women's tournament

Preliminary round

Knockout stage

Bocce

Men

Preliminary round

Knockout stage

Women

Boxing

Canoeing

Men

Cycling

Fencing

Men

Wonen

Football

Men's tournament

Team

Coach:  Gökhan Keskin

Preliminary round

Semifinal

Gold Medal match

Final standing

Gymnastics, artistic

Men

Women
Individual all-around

Vault

Balance beam

Gymnastics, rhythmic 

Qualification

Final

Handball

Men's tournament
Team

Coach:  Adnan Öztürk

Preliminary round
Group A

Semifinals

Bronze Medal Match

Final standing

Women's tournament
Team

Coach:  Hikmet Vurgun

Preliminary round
Group A

Placement 5th – 6th Match

Final standing

Judo

Men

Women

Karate

Men

Women

Rowing

Sailing

Men

Women

Shooting

Men

Women

Swimming

Men

Women

Paralympics

Table tennis

Men

Round robin

Knockout stage

Women

Round robin

Knockout stage

Taekwondo

Men

Women

Tennis

Men

Women

Volleyball

Men's tournament

Team

Coach:  Veljko Basic

Preliminary round

Semifinals

Bronze medal match

Final standing

Women's tournament
Team

Coach:  Massimo Barbolini

Preliminary round

Semifinals

Gold medal match

Final standing

Water polo

Men's tournament

Preliminary round

Elimination stage

Crossover

Final standing

Weightlifting

Men

Women

Wrestling

Men's Freestyle

Men's Greco-Roman

Women's Freestyle

References

External links
 Archery results at Mersin 2013
 Athletics results at Mersin 2013
 Badminton results at Mersin 2013
 Beach volleyball results at Mersin 2013
 Bocce results at Mersin 2013
Canoeing results at Mersin 2013
Gymnasticsi rhythmic results at Mersin 2013
Handball results at Mersin 2013
Judo results at Mersin 2013
Karate results at Mersin 2013
Rowing results at Mersin 2013
Sailing results at Mersin 2013
Shooting results at Mersin 2013
Swimming results at Mersin 2013
Table tennis results at Mersin 2013
Tennis results at Mersin 2013
Wrestling results at Mersin 2013

Nations at the 2013 Mediterranean Games
2013
Mediterranean Games